Alango may refer to:

Mildred Alango (born 1989), Kenyan taekwondo practitioner
Alango Township, St. Louis County, Minnesota